Nugzar Nuri-ipa Ashuba (Abkhaz: Нугзар Нури-иҧа Ашәба) is a senior politician from Abkhazia. He was Minister of Culture from 1986 until 1992 and the first Chairman of the State Repatriation Committee from 1992 until 1995. He was elected to the People's Assembly of Abkhazia in the 2002 elections, and he was elected Speaker on 3 April 2002 with 23 votes in favour, 10 against and 1 abstention. Ashuba was re-elected in 2007 both as Deputy and as Speaker, but suffered a first-round loss in the 2012 elections. When President Sergei Bagapsh died in 2011, and Vice President Alexander Ankvab participated in the subsequent Presidential election, Ashuba acted as President. On 29 October 2013, he was appointed Security Council Secretary by President Alexander Ankvab to succeed Stanislav Lakoba, who had been dismissed the previous day.

On 4 June 2014, following the forced resignation of Ankvab as President in the 2014 Abkhazian political crisis, Ashuba resigned as Security Council Secretary along with Presidential Administration Head Beslan Kubrava, accusing the opposition of carrying out a witch hunt and imposing its decisions on the interim authorities.

Early life

Nugzar Ashuba was born on March 2, 1952, in the village of Ghvada, Ochamchira District, and is married with two children.

References

1952 births
Living people
People from Ochamchira District
3rd convocation of the People's Assembly of Abkhazia
4th convocation of the People's Assembly of Abkhazia
Ministers for Culture of Abkhazia
Secretaries of the Security Council of Abkhazia